Guangji Temple is a Buddhist temple located on the southwest hillside of Mount Zhe, in Jinghu District of Wuhu, Anhui, China. Alongside Puji Temple, Nengren Temple and Jixiang Temple, Guangji Temple is known as one of the "Four Buddhist Temples in Wuhu". Guangji Temple has been praised as "Little Mount Jiuhua". Guangji Temple experienced expansion and repair for many times and now still maintain the basic architectural pattern of the Ming and Qing dynasties (1368–1911).

History

Tang dynasty
Guangji Temple traces its origins to the a temple built in the Qianning period (894–897) of Tang dynasty (618-907). In the Guanghua period (898–901), it was renamed "Yongqing Temple".

Song dynasty
In the reign of Emperor Zhenzong (1048–1085) in the Song dynasty (960–1276), it was renamed "Guangji Temple" which it still in use now.

Yuan dynasty
In the Yuan dynasty (1368–1644), a poet named Ouyang Yuan wrote a poem Mount Zhe to eulogize the beautiful and picturesque landscape of Mount Zhe and Guangji Temple.

Ming dynasty
Guangji Temple was abolished in the Yongle period (1403–1424) of the Ming dynasty (1368–1644) and reactivated its religious activities in the Jingtai period (1450–1456).

Qing dynasty
In 1756, in the period of the Qianlong Emperor of the Qing dynasty (1644–1911), Dai Tianpu and Wang Zhaohe donated property to renovate the temple. In 1798, in the reign of Jiaqing Emperor, abbot Yuejiang repaired the temple. In the Xianfeng period (1850–1861), a fire consumed the temple. The modern temple was rebuilt in the Guangxu period (1874–1908).

People's Republic of China
In 1983 it has been designated as a "National Key Buddhist Temple in Han Chinese Area".

Guangji Temple has been categorized as an AAAA level tourist site by the China National Tourism Administration.

Architecture

Guangji Temple is built along the up and down of Mount Zhe. Along the central axis are the Hall of Four Heavenly Kings, Hall of Bhaisajyaguru, Mahavira Hall, Hall of Ksitigarbha and the Pagoda.

Hall of Four Heavenly Kings
The Hall of Four Heavenly Kings is also the shanmen of the temple which is the first important hall in Guangji Temple. Maitreya is enshrined in the hall and at the back of his statue is a statue of Skanda. Heng and Ha, also known as Nryana, are enshrined in the left and right side of the hall.

Hall of Bhaisajyaguru
The Hall of Bhaisajyaguru is the hall to enshrine Bhaisajyaguru which is the second hall of Guangji Temple.

Mahavira Hall
The Mahavira Hall is the main hall of Guangji Temple. The Three-Life Buddha are enshrined in the temple. The statues of Eighteen Arhats stand on both sides of the hall.

Hall of Ksitigarbha
The Hall of Ksitigarbha is the most important annex halls in Guangji Temple. Two standing statues of Min Wen and Daoming are placed on both sides of Ksitigarbha.

References

External links

Buddhist temples in Wuhu
Buildings and structures in Wuhu
Tourist attractions in Wuhu
9th-century establishments in China
19th-century establishments in China
9th-century Buddhist temples
19th-century Buddhist temples